Azeffoun, the classical Rusazus and colonial PortGueydon, is a town and commune in Tizi Ouzou Province in northern Algeria, located on Cape Corbelin  north-east of Tizi Ouzou. The economy of the town of Azeffoun is based on tourism, fishing, and agriculture.

Geography 
It had a population of 16,096 inhabitants in 1998 and 17,435 inhabitants in 2008.

Azeffoun  is  bounded by the Mediterranean Sea on the north, the town  of  Aït Chafâa  on the east,  and  the  common  Akerrou,  Aghrib  in the south and Iflissen in the west.

Villages in the commune of Azeffoun

History 

The Phoenicians and Carthaginians established a fortress south of Cape Corbelin as part of their chain of colonies between the Strait of Gibraltar and their homelands. They named the cape and its settlement  ("Cape of the Fort").

The town fell under Roman hegemony after the Punic Wars. Under Augustus, the town was notionally refounded as a Roman colony, receiving the name Rusazus Colonia Augusti to honor its imperial benefactor. The Roman-era bishopric continues as a Catholic titular see.

Under colonial rule, Port Gueydonnamed after a French admiral and colonial administratorwas built on a nearby hillside in the last third of the 19th century.

Personalities linked to the commune

See also

List of lighthouses in Algeria

References

Citations

Bibliography
 .

Communes of Tizi Ouzou Province
Lighthouses in Algeria
Phoenician colonies in Algeria